Richard John Carwardine  (born 12 January 1947) is a Welsh historian and academic. He specialises in American politics and religion in the era of the American Civil War.

The professor is best known for his work on President Abraham Lincoln and was President of Corpus Christi College, Oxford, from 2010 to 2016.

Early life
Born in Cardiff, Wales, the son of John Francis Carwardine and Beryl Jones, he attended Maesycwmmer Primary School and Monmouth School, before going up to Corpus Christi College, Oxford as William Jones Exhibitioner, graduating BA in modern history 1968 (MA 1972).  He pursued further studies in history at The Queen's College, Oxford, receiving a Doctor of Philosophy in 1975.  Carwardine then went to the University of California, Berkeley, as the Ochs-Oakes Senior Scholar in American History and Institutions. 

While a student at Oxford, Carwardine played the role of Cornelius in the film Doctor Faustus (1967) with Richard Burton and Elizabeth Taylor.

Academic career
Carwardine taught American history at the University of Sheffield (1971–2002), where he also served as dean of the Faculty of Arts. He was a Rhodes Professor of American History & Institutions at Oxford University and a fellow of St Catherine's College from 2002 to 2009. Elected President of Corpus Christi College, he took office in January 2010, becoming a pro vice-chancellor of Oxford University.

Honours, fellowships and prizes
Fellow of the Royal Historical Society (1983)
Fellow of the British Academy (2006)

Companion of the Order of St Michael and St George (CMG) (2019)
Carwardine was inducted into The Lincoln Academy of Illinois and awarded the Order of Lincoln (the State's highest honour) by the Governor of Illinois in 2009 as a Bicentennial Laureate.

Bibliography
Carwardine, Richard. Transatlantic Revivalism: Popular Evangelicalism in Britain and America, 1790–1865. Westport, Conn: Greenwood Press, 1978.  
Carwardine, Richard. Evangelicals and Politics in Antebellum America. New Haven: Yale University Press, 1993.  
Carwardine, Richard. Abraham Lincoln and the Fourth Estate: The White House and the Press During the American Civil War. [Reading]: University of Reading, 2004.  
Carwardine, Richard. Lincoln: A Life of Purpose and Power. New York: Alfred A. Knopf, 2006.  
Carwardine, Richard, and Jay Sexton. The Global Lincoln. New York: Oxford University Press, 2011.   
Carwardine, Richard.  Lincoln's Sense of Humor.  Carbondale, IL: Southern Illinois University Press, 2017.

See also
 Haberdashers' Company

References

External links
 Lecture at the Pritzker Military Museum & Library
 Debrett's People of Today

1947 births
Living people
People educated at Monmouth School for Boys
Alumni of Corpus Christi College, Oxford
Alumni of The Queen's College, Oxford
Lincoln Prize winners
Academics of the University of Sheffield
Presidents of Corpus Christi College, Oxford
Fellows of the Royal Historical Society
Fellows of the Learned Society of Wales
Historians of the American Civil War
Historians of the University of Oxford
Companions of the Order of St Michael and St George
Statutory Professors of the University of Oxford
Fellows of the British Academy